The Chinese Presbyterian Church, also commonly known as CPC, is a Presbyterian church at the corner of Crown and Albion Streets, in Sydney, New South Wales, Australia. The church is reputedly the oldest surviving Chinese church in Australia. As at 2017, the church had a congregation of just under six hundred people meeting in worship services catering to languages of English, Cantonese, and Mandarin, and primarily seeks to reach out to the Chinese community of Sydney.

History
The first Chinese churches arose out of the gold rush of the 1860s in Victoria, to where numbers of migrants travelled to make their fortune. The Chinese Presbyterian Church can trace its foundation to the Presbyterian Chinese Mission formed by the Presbyterian Church of New South Wales as Sydney became an increasingly important centre for Chinese immigrants.

Location
The Chinese Presbyterian Church officially began in 1893, opening its first church building on Foster Street in Surry Hills. Its first clergyman was John Young Wai.  The church moved to Campbell Street in 1910, then moved to its current location at the Fullerton Memorial Church in 1957, located at the corner of Crown and Albion Streets. Today the church continues to worship at the Fullerton Memorial Church building and owns and uses various adjoining properties for ministry. Currently the moderator of the church is Rev Christopher Chan who succeeded Rev David Tsai after he had retired from moderatorship in 2016.

Relationships with other Chinese Churches 
It began as an 'inter-denominational' church based on Congregationalist church government principles.

Cornerstone Presbyterian Community Church was planted in  out of Chinese Presbyterian Church in 1992 with a group of 30 adults. In 1994, Cornerstone was constituted as a pastoral charge separate from the Chinese Presbyterian Church. The Cornerstone churches currently number three congregations, with plans to expand further.

The church partnered with the St James Presbyterian Church at first, becoming independent only in its second year, and was originally named Burwood Chinese Presbyterian Church. As the church outgrew its location, it sought out another place for a church building. In 2010, the new church building at Lidcombe was successfully built and was also renamed as GracePoint Chinese Presbyterian Church.

Challenges for the future

CPC faces challenges in considering and redefining its place as a Sydney Chinese church as at 2011 due to a slow but inevitable trend over the last several years for church members with growing young families to seek local Chinese churches as closer and more viable alternatives for Christian community. In addition, the presence of increasing numbers of local Chinese churches, of which some are not related to CPC in origin, mean that the Chinese Christian community is becoming more locally defined and decentralised from what was once a few large Chinese church communities. Increase in local outreach focus in the Surry Hills area is one such solution, including a focus on international expatriates and young working professionals working and living in the Surry Hills area.

References

External links 

 
 The Cornerstone Presbyterian Church website
 Gracepoint Chinese Presbyterian Church website
 Chinese Christian Church Milsons Point website
 West Sydney Chinese Christian Church website

Chinese-Australian culture in Sydney
Religious organizations established in 1893
19th-century Presbyterian churches
Presbyterian churches in Sydney
Churches completed in 1957
Surry Hills, New South Wales